Pa Sang is a tambon (subdistrict) of Mae Chan District, in Chiang Rai Province, Thailand. In 2020 it had a total population of 11,601 people.

Administration

Central administration
The tambon is subdivided into 15 administrative villages (muban).

Local administration
The whole area of the subdistrict is covered by the subdistrict municipality (Thesaban Tambon) Pa Sang (เทศบาลตำบลป่าซาง).

References

External links
Thaitambon.com on Pa Sang

Tambon of Chiang Rai province
Populated places in Chiang Rai province